These are the official results of the Men's Shot Put event at the 1997 IAAF World Championships in Athens, Greece. The original winner, Oleksandr Bagach, was later disqualified for Doping.

Medalists

Results

Qualification
Qualification: Qualifying Performance 19.80 (Q) or at least 12 best performers (q) advance to the final.

Final

References
 Results
 IAAF

s
Shot put at the World Athletics Championships